The Spier Falls Dam is a hydroelectric dam on the Hudson River between the towns of Moreau and Lake Luzerne, New York.

Construction

The dam was built by the Hudson River Water Power Company.  The chief engineer was Charles E. Parsons of Glens Falls.  Construction started in 1900 and completed in 1903 at a total cost of $US3,000,000. At the time it was the fourth largest dam and the largest power dam in the world.

The dam is constructed of concrete and granite quarried nearby– a rubble core with trimmed blocks on the surface. As many as 1500 men were employed in construction at one time

Power generation
When built the dam generated 37 MW, of three-phase 40 Hz power, and provided electricity to Saratoga, Schenectady, Glens Falls, Troy, and Albany. As of 2013 the Spier Falls Dam is owned by Brookfield Power and generates 56 MW.

Statistics

While the reservoir was filling the flow of the Hudson River was halted for twenty-four hours.  The river ran dry past Fort Edward and pedestrians were able to walk across.

The dam was named for William E. Spier, the head of the Glens Falls Paper Company.

References

Buildings and structures in Saratoga County, New York
Dams in New York (state)
Hydroelectric power plants in New York (state)
Engineering projects
Dams completed in 1903
1903 establishments in New York (state)